Brian J. Byrne (born 1942) is an Australian social scientist specializing in applied and psycholinguistics, an emeritus professor at the University of New England in Australia, and lead author of publications and articles on research in his field. Byrne was a lead researcher in the 10-year-long, $5 million National Institutes of Health study by an international team of scientists into the development of reading ability in 1,000 pairs of twins.  Beginning in 2000, the study found that genetics were more important influences on reading development than environmental factors.  In 2012, Byrne was appointed a lead researcher in a similar Australian study of twins.

Twins linguistics research
In 2000, Byrne and the Department of Psychology at the University of New England (UNE), with support from the Australian Research Council, were selected by the United States National Institute of Health to take part in a $US5 million study of the development of reading ability in children.  The study also included research teams in Colorado, Nevada, and Norway and other prominent social scientists such as John C. DeFries.  The study used twins as its research subjects in order to better examine the impact of genetics versus environmental factors in the development of reading ability.  UNE's share of the funding was $US1.14 million over five years.  The Australian portion of the project initially studied eighty pairs of identical and fraternal twins from Sydney and Melbourne listed in the National Health and Medical Research Council's Twins Registry based at the University of Melbourne.

In 2008, the researchers published the results of their research, finding that genetic factors were more influential than environmental ones in the development of reading ability in children.  Byrne cautioned, however, that, "Intensive and well-designed classroom and preschool interventions can make a difference for struggling readers." Byrne was subsequently selected in 2012 as lead researcher for a follow-on study of 2,000 twins listed in the National Literacy and Numeracy Assessment.

Selected publications

References

External links

Developmental psycholinguists
Australian psychologists
Australian social scientists
Living people
Place of birth missing (living people)
Academic staff of the University of New England (Australia)
Australian scientists
University of Sydney alumni
1942 births
McMaster University alumni